John Edgar Bryson (born July 24, 1943) Citing Bryson's environmental views, United States Senator James Inhofe, a Republican from Oklahoma, put a hold on his nomination in July. The Senate later reached a unanimous consent agreement to vote on Bryson's nomination, and the Senate confirmed Bryson by a 74–26 vote on October 20, 2011. He was sworn in on October 21, 2011, becoming the 37th Secretary of the Department of Commerce.

As Secretary of Commerce, Bryson co-chaired the White House Office of Manufacturing Policy with Gene Sperling.

2012 traffic accidents and resignation 
On June 9, 2012, Bryson was involved in a pair of car crashes in San Gabriel, California and Rosemead, California, which were investigated as possible felony hit and run. He is said to have been found unconscious at the site of the second crash.  A Department of Commerce spokesperson confirmed he was involved in a crash, and said Bryson had suffered from a seizure.  Los Angeles County prosecutors announced on July 3, 2012, that no criminal charges would be pursued.

On June 11, Bryson announced in a memo that he was taking a medical leave of absence. Deputy Secretary of Commerce Rebecca Blank began serving as Acting Secretary of Commerce.

On June 21, 2012, Bryson announced his resignation from the post of Secretary of Commerce.

In July, it was reported that Bryson would not be criminally charged for the collisions, as they resulted from the cognitive effect of unexpected seizure.

Later life
Bryson joined the Woodrow Wilson International Center for Scholars as a Distinguished Senior Public Policy Scholar in October 2012.

Personal
Bryson is married to Louise. Their four daughters graduated from the Polytechnic School in Pasadena, California. Bryson and his wife both served on the school's Board of Trustees. Bryson and his wife reside in San Marino, California.

References

External links
Profile at Bloomberg Businessweek
Profile at Forbes
Profile at The Walt Disney Company

John Bryson is the Right Man at the Right Time to Lead Commerce Department, Frances Beinecke, President of NRDC, May 31, 2011
 Secretary of Commerce

|-

|-

|-

|-

|-

1943 births
Living people
21st-century American politicians
American corporate directors
Boeing people
Cleveland High School (Portland, Oregon) alumni
Directors of The Walt Disney Company
Fellows of the American Academy of Arts and Sciences
Lawyers from Portland, Oregon
Natural Resources Defense Council people
Obama administration cabinet members
People associated with energy
People associated with Morrison & Foerster
Stanford University alumni
United States Secretaries of Commerce
Yale Law School alumni